State Route 281 (SR 281) is an approximately  state highway in the U.S. state of California that runs along Soda Bay Road from near the southern shore of Clear Lake to State Route 29 (SR 29) in Glenview in Lake County. SR 281 is legislatively defined to be a loop route of SR 29 that runs along or near the southern edge of Clear Lake from Glenview to Lakeport, but most of this is unconstructed.

Route description
The route currently begins at Clear Lake from Soda Bay Road and heads south. After three miles, it meets its south end at State Route 29.

The planned segment west along Soda Bay Road to Lakeport remains unconstructed. This portion of Soda Bay Road is currently Lake County Route 502.

SR 281 is not part of the National Highway System, a network of highways that are considered essential to the country's economy, defense, and mobility by the Federal Highway Administration.

Major intersections

See also

References

External links

Caltrans: Route 281 highway conditions
California Highways: Route 281
California @ AARoads.com - State Route 281

281
State Route 281